Porophyllum ruderale is an herbaceous annual plant whose leaves can be used for seasoning food. The taste has been described as "somewhere between arugula, cilantro and rue". The plant is commonly grown in Mexico and South America for use in salsas.

The plant is easy to grow from seed in a well-drained soil, which should be allowed to dry between watering.

Culture

Having been used by many cultures, Porophyllum ruderale is known by many names, including Bolivian coriander, quillquiña (also spelled quirquiña or quilquiña), yerba porosa, killi, pápalo, tepegua, rupay wachi, mampuritu, pápaloquelite and summer cilantro. Despite the name "Bolivian coriander" and "summer cilantro", this plant is not botanically related to Coriandrum sativum.

The terms pápaloquelite and pápalo are used in Mexico, and the herb there commonly accompanies tacos. Not all Mexicans enjoy its taste, but some find that it improves the flavor of tacos and typical Mexican salsas and soups.

In Bolivia it is typically used as an ingredient along with tomatoes and locotos to prepare llajwa.

In Puebla cuisine, pápalo is used as a condiment on traditional cemita sandwiches, a regional type of Mexican torta.

Pápalo was used in the Azteca era, but never as medicine, only as food.

One study claims that pápalo exhibits some health benefits such as lowering cholesterol, lowering blood pressure, and aiding digestion.

Medical uses
Papalo is a plant that is used medically to reduce swelling of infected injuries. It is also known to be consumed to help with high blood pressure, treating liver ailments, and to help with stomach disorders.

References
3. Nair, P. (2017, May 14). Health benefits of papalo. Value Food. https://www.valuefood.info/2096/health-benefits-of-papalo/

4. Ravindran, P. (2018). The Encyclopedia of Herbs and Spices: Two Volume Set (Vol. 2). CABI.

External links

Herbs
Spices
Tageteae